Regina Regina was an American country music duo formed in 1995. The duo consisted of female singers Regina Leigh and Regina Nicks, respectively natives of North Carolina and Lufkin, Texas. Leigh was formerly a backing vocalist in Reba McEntire's road band, while Nicks was a personal assistant for McEntire and a former member of Dave & Sugar. The two met through the assistance of producer Wally Wilson, who wanted to include Nicks in a female duo. Nicks felt that she was unable to find a suitable singing partner until Leigh heard one of her demos and decided that she wanted to work with Nicks. The two were brought to Giant Records then-president James Stroud in 1995.

Regina Regina released its only album in 1997. The duo's only charting single in the U.S. was "More Than I Wanted to Know", which peaked at No. 53 on Billboards Hot Country Singles & Tracks.

Discography

Albums

Singles

Music videos

References

Country music groups from Tennessee
Country music duos
Musical groups established in 1995
Musical groups disestablished in 1997
Giant Records (Warner) artists